"Alarm" is a song by English singer and songwriter Anne-Marie.  It was released on 20 May 2016 by Major Tom's, Asylum Records, and Atlantic Records as the lead single from her debut studio album, Speak Your Mind (2018). The song was written by Anne-Marie, Wayne Hector, Steve Mac and Ina Wroldsen, with the production being handled by Mac and additional production by Rudimental band member Amir Amor and additional synths and FX's added by Brunelle.

"Alarm" was a commercial success. It became  Anne-Marie's first major worldwide hit, peaking at No. 16 on the UK Singles Chart. The single additionally reached the top 20 in Australia and Scotland, as well as the top 40 in seven countries. It was certified Platinum in the UK, Australia and Poland. It has also been certified Gold in the US and Canada.

Anne-Marie performed the song at the beginning of the 2016 MTV Europe Music Awards. The music video for the song, also released on 20 May 2016, was directed by Malia James and filmed in Mexico City. It is loosely inspired by Baz Luhrmann's 1996 film Romeo + Juliet.

Track listing

Charts

Weekly charts

Year-end charts

Certifications

Release history

References

2016 songs
2016 singles
Asylum Records singles
Atlantic Records singles
Songs written by Steve Mac
Songs written by Wayne Hector
Songs written by Ina Wroldsen
Song recordings produced by Steve Mac
Anne-Marie (singer) songs
Songs written by Anne-Marie (singer)